John A. Luke Jr. is an American businessman. He serves as chairman and CEO of the MeadWestvaco Corporation.

Education
Luke attended The Hotchkiss School and then Lawrence University, where he received his Bachelor of Arts in 1971. He attended the Wharton School of the University of Pennsylvania and received his master's degree in business administration in 1979.

Career
Luke has served as the chairman and chief executive officer of MeadWestvaco Corporation since 2002.  Previously, he was the president and chief executive officer from 2002 to 2003 and chairman, president, and CEO of Westvaco Corporation from 1996 to 2002. He currently serves on the board of directors of American Forest and Paper Association, The Timken Company, National Association of Manufacturers, The Bank of New York Mellon and FM Global.

Luke sits on the board of trustees of the American Enterprise Institute. He has also been on the board of Virginia Museum of Fine Arts, The First Tee, and VCU College of Engineering.

Compensation
While CEO of MeadWestvaco Corporation in 2008, Luke earned a total compensation of $5,675,606, which included a base salary of $1,055,903, no cash bonus, stocks granted of $2,862,256, options granted of $1,585,431 and other compensation of $172,016.

Personal life
Luke is married to Kathleen Allen.

References

Year of birth missing (living people)
Living people
Hotchkiss School alumni
Lawrence University alumni
Wharton School of the University of Pennsylvania alumni
American chief executives
American Enterprise Institute